North Australia can refer to a short-lived former British colony, a former federal territory of the Commonwealth of Australia, or a proposed state which would replace the current Northern Territory.

Colony (1846–1847)

A colony of North Australia existed briefly after it was authorised by letters patent of 17 February 1846. The colony comprised all land in the Northern Territory and the present state of Queensland lying north of the 26th parallel.  The capital was at Port Curtis, now called Gladstone, under Colonel George Barney as Lieutenant-Governor and Superintendent. Charles Augustus FitzRoy, the Governor of New South Wales, was Governor. The colony was proclaimed at a ceremony at Settlement Point on 30 January 1847. The establishment of the new colony, and its status as a penal colony, attracted much criticism in the New South Wales Legislative Council. The Letters Patent establishing the colony were revoked in December the same year, after a change of government in Britain, although Colonel Barney and his party did not receive the news until 1847, when the news arrived in Sydney on 15 April 1847. The colony was intended as a new penal colony after the end of transportation in the older Australian colonies.

Territory (1927–1931)
North Australia was a short-lived territory of Australia. George Pearce, Minister for Home and Territories in the federal government in the 1920s, thought that the Northern Territory was too large to be adequately governed. So on 1 February 1927, under the Northern Australia Act 1926 (Cth), the Northern Territory was split into two territories, North Australia and Central Australia, respectively above and below latitude 20° S. However, on 12 June 1931, the two were reunited as the Northern Territory.

See also

Northern Australia
Northern Territory
History of Australia
Central Australia
Central Australia (territory)
States and territories of Australia
Territorial evolution of Australia
Proposals for new Australian States

References

Further reading

Former British colonies and protectorates in Oceania
1846 establishments in the British Empire
States and territories established in 1846
States and territories disestablished in 1847
States and territories established in 1927
States and territories disestablished in 1931
History of the Northern Territory
Pre-Separation Queensland
Northern Australia